Mohamed Roubize (born 11 November 1985) is a Senegalese former professional footballer who played as a midfielder.

Early life
Roubize was born in Senegal to a Lebanese father and a Senegalese mother.

Club career 
Coming from Moroccan Botola side Difaâ El Jadidi, Roubize joined Saudi Professional League side Ettifaq in summer 2007. He moved to fellow-Saudi Arabian club Al-Hazem in summer 2008; Roubize's contract was terminated on 5 February 2011.

Roubize returned to Morocco, playing for Moghreb Tétouan in the Botola during the 2011–12 season; he moved to Oman Professional League side Al-Orouba in summer 2012. In summer 2013, Roubize joined Al Hala in Bahrain, playing in the 2013–14 season.

International career 
On 14 October 2009, Roubize represented the Senegal national team in a friendly game against South Korea; he came on as a 70th-minute substitute in a 2–0 defeat.

Honours
Ettifaq
 Saudi Crown Prince Cup: 2007–08
 Gulf Club Champions Cup runner-up: 2007

Moghreb Tétouan
 Botola: 2011–12

References

External links
 
 
 
 

1985 births
Living people
Senegalese footballers
Senegalese people of Lebanese descent
Sportspeople of Lebanese descent
Association football midfielders
Difaâ Hassani El Jadidi players
Ettifaq FC players
Al-Hazem F.C. players
Al-Orouba SC players
Al Hala SC players
Moghreb Tétouan players
Botola players
Saudi Professional League players
Oman Professional League players
Bahraini Premier League players
Senegal international footballers
Senegalese expatriate footballers
Senegalese expatriate sportspeople in Morocco
Senegalese expatriate sportspeople in Saudi Arabia
Senegalese expatriate sportspeople in Oman
Senegalese expatriate sportspeople in Bahrain
Expatriate footballers in Morocco
Expatriate footballers in Saudi Arabia
Expatriate footballers in Oman
Expatriate footballers in Bahrain